The Inkanyamba is a legendary serpent said to be living in a waterfall lake area in the northern forests near Pietermaritzburg most commonly in the base of Howick Falls, South Africa. The Zulu people of the area believe it to be a large serpent with an equine head. It is a very tall creature. Most active in the summer months, it is believed that the Inkanyamba's anger causes the seasonal storms.

References

Legendary serpents
South African legendary creatures
Water monsters
Zulu legendary creatures